Neelagiri Express is a 1968 Indian Tamil-language thriller film directed by Thirumalai–Mahalingam and written by Cho Ramaswamy. The music was composed by T. K. Ramamoorthy. The film stars Jaishankar, Cho, Vijaya Nirmala and Vijaya Lalitha. It is a remake of a 1967 Malayalam film Cochin Express (1967). The film was released on 23 March 1968 and was a commercial success.

Plot 

A murder takes place aboard Neelagiri Express, bound to Coimbatore from Madras. Ravanan is the only passenger who is travelling with a deceased. One of Ravanan's co-passengers is a mysterious woman named Kalavathy. She takes him off the train to have food at Arakkonam and purposely makes him lose the train, and she disappears. In the meantime, a wealthy man named Sabapathy is murdered, and Ravanan becomes a crime suspect. CID Inspector Shankar is assigned the task of nabbing the criminal behind the murder. He realises that Ravanan is innocent and begins the investigation. So, he sets out of solving the case with the help of Ravanan and eventually finds the murderer.

Cast 
 Jaishankar as CID Inspector Shankar
 S. A. Ashokan as the villain with eye-patch
 Cho Ramaswamy as Ravanan
 Vijaya Nirmala as Geetha
 Vijaya Lalitha as Kalavathy
 V. S. Raghavan as Sabapathy
S. V. Ramadas as Boopathy
 K. Vijayan as Kumar
 S. Parvathi as Mahalakshmi
 Tambaram Lalitha as Geetha's mother
Kallapart Natarajan
 Srividya (special appearance in the song "Thiruthani Muruga Thennava Thalaiva")
 M. Bhanumathi (special appearance in the song "Thiruthani Muruga Thennava Thalaiva")

Soundtrack 
The music was composed by T. K. Ramamoorthy and the lyrics were written by Kannadasan.

Release and reception 
Neelagiri Express was released on 23 March 1968. Kalki said the story looked like it lacked salt and pepper. Despite this, it was a commercial success.

References

External links 
 

1960s mystery thriller films
1960s spy thriller films
1960s Tamil-language films
1968 films
Fictional portrayals of the Tamil Nadu Police
Films about organised crime in India
Films set on trains
Indian black-and-white films
Indian mystery thriller films
Indian spy thriller films
Tamil remakes of Malayalam films